Morten Lund (born September 13, 1972) is a Danish jazz drummer. He co-leads a trio with Italian pianist Stefano Bollani and Danish bassist Jesper Bodilsen, and he is a member of Paolo Fresu's Devil Quartet and Kind of Porgy and Bess ensembles. As a sideman he has participated on more than 60 albums.

Biography
Lund was born into a musical family in Viborg, Denmark, in 1972 to a father who played drums, trumpet, and guitar and was active part of the city's jazz scene, and a mother who played flute. At age 6, he started to play drums. He got his first paid jobs at age 15. In 1993 he was accepted into the Royal Academy of Music in Aarhus and only a year later, still a student, he started to play in the internationally recognized Klüvers Big Band. With this band that he recorded his first album.

After receiving his diploma in 1997, he moved to Copenhagen and was soon involved in several projects, recording and going on tours. Jesper Bodilsen, with whom he had studied at the Academy, has been a close collaborator on many projects. In 2002 Lund and Bodilsen were among the musicians selected for the Jazzpar Sextet which Enrico Rava formed, as was  virtuoso Italian pianist Stefano Bollani. Because the chemistry was good among them, they formed a trio the following year. Their first album, Mi ritorni in mente, was released the same year to critical acclaim and became one of the ten best selling records in Italy  that year.

After tours in Italy and Scandinavia it was clear that the collaboration was going to be of a more lasting nature. They went on to play in jazz clubs and at festivals around the world. Their debut in New York City was at the legendary Birdland Club. In 2006 the trio released their second album, Gleda, which is centred on Scandinavian songs.

Honors 
 Ben Webster Prize, 2006
 Australian Jazz Bell Awards nomination, Best International Jazz Release for Gleda, 2006

Discography 
With Stefano Bollani and Jesper Bodilsen
 Mi ritorni in mente, (Stunt, 2003)
 Gleda, Songs from Scandinavia, (Stunt, 2006)
 Stone in the Water, (ECM, 2009)

With Yelena Eckemoff and Mads Vinding
 Grass Catching the Wind, (L&H, 2010)

Collaboration
2014: Joy In Spite of Everything (ECM), Stefao Bollani

Gallery

References 

1972 births
Living people
Danish jazz drummers
Danish jazz musicians
People from Viborg Municipality
21st-century drummers